A triplet is a set of three items, which may be in a specific order, or unordered. It may refer to:

Science
 A series of three nucleotide bases forming an element of the Genetic code
 J-coupling as part of Nuclear magnetic resonance spectroscopy
 Opal in preparation to be a gemstone
 Spin triplet in quantum mechanics — as in triplet oxygen, or triplet state in general
 Tuple of length 3 in mathematics
 Each of the children born in a three-child multiple birth; identical or fraternal, as are twins and quadruplets and quintuplets

Technologies
 Photography triplet or paint triplet
 Triplet lens, optical device consisting of three single lenses
 Tandem bicycle with three seats

Other uses
 In music, a tuplet of three successive notes of equal duration
 The Triplets, a Spanish children's book
 The Triplets (band), a Latin pop group
 A triplet, a kind of assembled gem
 Triplets, the multiple birth of three children, whether identical or fraternal as are twins, quadruplets and quintuplets.

See also
 Binghamton Triplets, a minor league baseball team
 First Hurwitz triplet, a triple of distinct Hurwitz surfaces with the identical automorphism group of the lowest possible genus
 Triplet Lakes, a group of lakes in Minnesota
 The Triplets of Belleville, a 2003 French animated film by Sylvain Chomet
 Tercet in poetry
 Tristich in poetry
 Triad (disambiguation), another general term for a group of three
 Triptych, a work of art which is divided into three sections
 Trilogy

3 (number)